Pablo Prigioni (born May 17, 1977) is an Argentine-Italian former professional basketball player, currently serving as an assistant coach for the Minnesota Timberwolves. He played the point guard position, and was a member of the senior Argentina national basketball team that won the bronze medal at the 2008 Summer Olympics. Prigioni is the oldest rookie in NBA history, making his debut with the New York Knicks in 2012 at age 35, prior to which he was a two-time All-EuroLeague selection playing in Europe, most notably Spain. He played four seasons in the NBA for the New York Knicks, Houston Rockets, and the Los Angeles Clippers, before starting coaching in 2017.

Professional career

Ramallo (1995–1996) 
Prigioni began his professional career with Ramallo of the Argentine LNB League during the 1995–96 season.

Belgrano San Nicolás (1996–1998) 
Prigioni moved to Belgrano San Nicolás in 1996, playing with them until 1998.

Obras Sanitarias (1998–1999) 
Prigioni transferred to Obras Sanitarias in 1998 and played with the club until 1999.

Fuenlabrada (1999–2001) 
In 1999, Prigioni moved to the Spanish club Fuenlabrada, where he stayed until 2001.

Lucentum Alicante (2001–2003) 
In 2001, Prigioni joined the Spanish club Lucentum Alicante, and he played there until 2003.

Baskonia (2003–2009) 
In 2003, Prigioni joined the EuroLeague team Baskonia. With Baskonia he won several titles, including: 3 Spanish King's Cups in the years 2004, 2006, 2009; 4 Spanish Supercups in the years 2005, 2006, 2007, 2008; and the Spanish League championship in 2008.

Real Madrid (2009–2011) 
In 2009, Prigioni joined Real Madrid.

Return to Baskonia (2011–2012) 
In August 2011, Prigioni returned to Baskonia, signing a one-year deal.

New York Knicks (2012–2015) 
On July 24, 2012, Prigioni signed a one-year contract with the New York Knicks for the rookie minimum. At age 35, Prigioni became the oldest rookie in NBA history, when he made his debut on November 2, 2012. He became the team's starting point guard for the last two months of the 2012–13 season, as well as for the playoffs. In game 6 of the Knicks' first-round playoff series against the Boston Celtics, Prigioni made 3 three-pointers in the first quarter. The Knicks won 88–80, to advance to the second round of the playoffs for the first time in 13 years.

On July 10, 2013, Prigioni re-signed with the Knicks.

Houston Rockets (2015) 
On February 19, 2015, Prigioni was traded to the Houston Rockets, in exchange for Alexey Shved, and two second-round draft picks.

Los Angeles Clippers (2015–2016) 
On July 20, 2015, the Rockets traded Prigioni, Joey Dorsey, Nick Johnson, Kostas Papanikolaou, a 2016 first-round draft pick, and cash considerations, to the Denver Nuggets, in exchange for Ty Lawson and a 2017 second-round draft pick. Prigioni was immediately waived by Denver, upon being acquired.

On August 3, 2015, Prigioni signed with the Los Angeles Clippers. On January 13, 2016, he had a career-high eight steals against the Miami Heat, which was one shy of the franchise record, held by his head coach, Doc Rivers. On April 8, 2016, he recorded a season-high 13 points, a career-high seven rebounds, and a season-high seven assists, in a 102–99 overtime win over the Utah Jazz.

On July 29, 2016, Prigioni signed with the Houston Rockets, returning to the franchise for a second stint. However, he was waived by the Rockets on October 24, 2016, after appearing in five preseason games with them.

Third stint with Baskonia (2016–2017) 
On December 5, 2016, Prigioni returned to Baskonia, signing with them for the rest of the season. He officially retired from his professional basketball playing career on January 9, 2017. During his professional career, Prigioni played in 10 EuroLeague seasons, in which he had career averages of 6.1 points, 4.3 assists, 2.5 rebounds, and 1.7 steals per game, and in four NBA seasons, in which he had career regular season averages of 3.5 points, 2.8 assists, 1.9 rebounds, and 1.0 steals per game.

Coaching career

Baskonia (2017) 
On 16 June 2017, Prigioni began his coaching career, when he signed a two-year deal with Baskonia, to become their new head coach. However, on October 26, Prigioni stepped down as Baskonia head coach, after having a 0–3 start in the EuroLeague and a 2–3 start in the Liga ACB.

Brooklyn Nets (2018–2019) 
On 24 April 2018, Prigioni joined the Brooklyn Nets as an assistant coach. During the 2018–19 NBA season, the Nets returned to the NBA playoffs for the first time since 2015.

Minnesota Timberwolves (2019–present) 
On 7 June 2019, Prigioni was hired by the Minnesota Timberwolves as an assistant coach. He coached the Wolves in the 2019 Las Vegas Summer League and was put in charge of the team's offense for the following season.

Argentina (2022–present) 
On 1 September 2022, Prigioni became the head coach of the Argentina men's national basketball team.

National team career
As a member of the Argentine senior men's national basketball team, Prigioni played at the 2006 FIBA World Championship. He won silver medals at the 2003 FIBA Americas Championship and 2007 FIBA Americas Championship. Prigioni was also a member of the Argentina national team that competed at the 2008 Summer Olympics and won the bronze medal. He also won the bronze medal at the 2009 FIBA Americas Championship, and the gold medal at the 2011 FIBA Americas Championship.

Career statistics

EuroLeague

|-
| style="text-align:left;"| 2003–04
| style="text-align:left;"| Baskonia
| 20 || 10 || 22.7 || .452 || .409 || .810 || 2.1 || 4.0 || 1.9 || .2 || 6.0 || 8.9
|-
| style="text-align:left;"| 2004–05
| style="text-align:left;"| Baskonia
| 21 || 7 || 19.5 || .394 || .313 || .893 || 2.0 || 3.0 || 1.1 || .0 || 4.4 || 6.6
|-
| style="text-align:left;"| 2005–06
| style="text-align:left;"| Baskonia
| 25 || 22 || 27.1 || .462 || .368 || .837 || 2.1 || style="background:#CFECEC;"| 6.2 || 2.2 || .0 || 5.8 || 11.7
|-
| style="text-align:left;"| 2006–07
| style="text-align:left;"| Baskonia
| 23 || 13 || 25.3 || .442 || .352 || .913 || 2.8 || 4.7 || 2.5 || .0 || 6.6 || 11.6
|-
| style="text-align:left;"| 2007–08
| style="text-align:left;"| Baskonia
| 25 || 2 || 23.7 || .375 || .327 || .902 || 2.7 || 4.1 || 1.5 || .0 || 7.0 || 9.0
|-
| style="text-align:left;"| 2008–09
| style="text-align:left;"| Baskonia
| 21 || 19 || 26.6 || .433 || .427 || .545 || 2.5 || 4.3 || 1.5 || .0 || 6.4 || 9.5
|-
| style="text-align:left;"| 2009–10
| style="text-align:left;"| Real Madrid
| 20 || 19 || 27.6 || .422 || .328 || .861 || 2.5 || 4.3 || 1.5 || .1 || 7.0 || 10.1
|-
| style="text-align:left;"| 2010–11
| style="text-align:left;"| Real Madrid
| 18 || 13 || 25.5 || .370 || .344 || .762 || 2.6 || 3.4 || 1.4 || .0 || 5.4 || 8.8
|-
| style="text-align:left;"| 2011–12
| style="text-align:left;"| Baskonia
| 10 || 6 || 28.6 || .439 || .308 || .846 || 3.2 || 4.6 || 2.2 || .0 || 7.3 || 12.8
|-
| style="text-align:left;"| 2016–17
| style="text-align:left;"| Baskonia
| 3 || 0 || 8.7 || .000 || .000 || .000 || 1.7 || 2.0 || .7 || .0 || 0.0 || 1.7
|- class="sortbottom"
| style="text-align:center;" colspan=2 | Career
| 186 || 111 || 24.7 || .419 || .351 || .831 || 2.5 || 4.3 || 1.7 || .0 || 6.1 || 9.6

NBA

Regular season

|-
| style="text-align:left;"| 
| style="text-align:left;"| New York
| 78 || 18 || 16.2 || .455 || .396 || .880 || 1.8 || 3.0 || .9 || .0 || 3.5
|-
| style="text-align:left;"| 
| style="text-align:left;"| New York
| 66 || 27 || 19.4 || .461 || .464 || .917 || 2.0 || 3.5 || 1.0 || .0 || 3.8
|-
| style="text-align:left;"| 
| style="text-align:left;"| New York
| 43 || 3 || 18.5 || .422 || .374 || .846 || 1.9 || 2.4 || 1.2 || .0 || 4.7
|-
| style="text-align:left;"| 
| style="text-align:left;"| Houston
| 24 || 0 || 17.7 || .343 || .275 || .867 || 1.6 || 2.8 || 1.1 || .0 || 3.0
|-
| style="text-align:left;"| 
| style="text-align:left;"| L.A. Clippers
| 59 || 3 || 13.9 || .374 || .295 || .875 || 1.9 || 2.2 || .9 || .0 || 3.6
|- class="sortbottom"
| style="text-align:center;" colspan="2"| Career
| 270 || 51 || 16.9 || .425 || .379 || .872 || 1.9 || 2.8 || 1.0 || .0 || 3.5

Playoffs

|-
| style="text-align:left;"| 2013
| style="text-align:left;"| New York
| 11 || 10 || 20.9 || .395 || .433 || .500 || 1.5 || 3.2 || 1.3 || .1 || 4.5
|-'
| style="text-align:left;"| 2015
| style="text-align:left;"| Houston
| 17 || 0 || 17.2 || .333 || .293 || .750 || 1.1 || 2.3 || .9 || .0 || 3.1
|-'
| style="text-align:left;"| 2016
| style="text-align:left;"| L.A. Clippers
| 5 || 0 || 5.2 || .0 || .0 || .0 || 0.6 || 1.4 || .0 || .0 || .0
|- class="sortbottom"
| style="text-align:center;" colspan=2| Career
| 33 || 10 || 16.6 || .343 || .342 || .625|| 1.2 || 2.5 || .9 || .0 || 3.1

Awards and accomplishments

Pro career
 Spanish Prince's Cup (Spanish 2nd Cup) Winner: (2002)
 Led the Spanish League in steals: (2003)
 3× Spanish King's Cup Winner: (2004, 2006, 2009)
 4× Spanish Supercup Winner: (2005, 2006, 2007, 2008)
 Spanish King's Cup MVP: (2006)
 2× All-EuroLeague 2nd Team: (2006, 2007)
 Led the EuroLeague in assists: (2006)
 3× All-ACB Team: (2006, 2007, 2009)
 Spanish League Champion: (2008)
 Spanish Supercup MVP: (2008)

Argentina national team
 2003 FIBA Americas Championship: 
 2003 South American Championship: 
 2004 South American Championship: 
 2007 FIBA Americas Championship: 
 2008 FIBA Diamond Ball Tournament: 
 2008 Summer Olympics: 
 2009 FIBA Americas Championship: 
 2011 FIBA Americas Chamship:

See also

References

External links
 
 Pablo Prigioni at Liga ACB 
 
 Pablo Prigioni at EuroLeague (player)
 Pablo Prigioni at EuroLeague (coach)
 
  

1977 births
Living people
2006 FIBA World Championship players
2010 FIBA World Championship players
2014 FIBA Basketball World Cup players
Argentine basketball coaches
Argentine expatriate basketball people in Spain
Argentine expatriate basketball people in the United States
Argentine expatriate sportspeople in Italy
Argentine men's basketball players
Argentine people of Italian descent
Baloncesto Fuenlabrada players
Basketball players at the 2003 Pan American Games
Basketball players at the 2008 Summer Olympics
Basketball players at the 2012 Summer Olympics
Belgrano de San Nicolás basketball players
Brooklyn Nets assistant coaches
Houston Rockets players
Italian men's basketball players
Italian people of Argentine descent
Liga ACB players
Los Angeles Clippers players
Medalists at the 2008 Summer Olympics
Minnesota Timberwolves assistant coaches
National Basketball Association players from Argentina
New York Knicks players
Obras Sanitarias basketball players
Olympic basketball players of Argentina
Olympic bronze medalists for Argentina
Olympic medalists in basketball
Pan American Games competitors for Argentina
People with acquired Italian citizenship
Point guards
Real Madrid Baloncesto players
Saski Baskonia coaches
Saski Baskonia players
Spanish men's basketball players
Sportspeople from Córdoba Province, Argentina
Undrafted National Basketball Association players